Queen of the Night is a 1951 West German musical film directed by Kurt Hoffmann and starring Ilse Werner, Hans Holt and Georg Thomalla. It was shot at the Spandau Studios in West Berlin.

Synopsis
The Duke of Novara-Liechtenstein flees his homeland to escape from an arranged marriage with Princess Anna Silvana. She pursues him and tracks him down to the hotel where he is staying.

Cast
 Ilse Werner as Anna Silvana, Prinzessin von Este-Parma
 Hans Holt as Ferdinand, Herzog von Novara-Liechtenstein
 Georg Thomalla as Peter von Hazi
 Jeanette Schultze as Julia
 Ethel Reschke as Marina
 Käthe Haack as Margarete
 Bärbel Spanuth as Barby
 Paul Westermeier as Alexander, Erbherzog von Novara-Liechtenstein
 Paul Heidemann as Hoteldirektor Küküs
 Kurt Pratsch-Kaufmann as Hoteldetektiv Barak
 Jakob Tiedtke as Moritzki
 Erich Fiedler as Ganove
 Walter Gross as Ganove
 Franz-Otto Krüger as Ganove
 Willi Rose as Ganove
 Michael Symo as Ganove
 Vera de Luca as Singer

References

Bibliography 
 Goble, Alan. The Complete Index to Literary Sources in Film. Walter de Gruyter, 1999.

External links 
 

1951 films
1951 musical comedy films
German musical comedy films
West German films
1950s German-language films
Films directed by Kurt Hoffmann
Operetta films
Films based on operettas
Films set in hotels
Films set in Europe
German black-and-white films
1950s German films
Films shot at Spandau Studios